Lieutenant General Carl Nils Gabriel Årmann (24 August 1894 – 21 April 1988) was a Swedish Army officer and modern pentathlete. He competed at the 1924 Summer Olympics and finished tenth.

Early life
Årmann was born on 24 August 1894 in Stora Mellösa, Sweden, the son of estate owner Nils Årmann and his wife Alva (née Lange). He passed studentexamen in Örebro in 1913.

Career

Military career
Årmann was commissioned as an officer in 1915 with the rank of second lieutenant and was assigned to Uppland Artillery Regiment (A 5). He completed the higher course at the Artillery and Engineering College from 1918 to 1920 and was captain of the General Staff in 1926. Årmann was teacher at the Artillery and Engineering College from 1928 to 1934 and served in Uppland Artillery Regiment (A 5) in 1934.

He was major of the General Staff in 1936 and was promoted to lieutenant colonel in 1939 and served in Uppland Artillery Regiment (A 5) in 1940. Årmann was promoted to colonel in 1941 and was appointed head of the Artillery and Engineering College in 1941 and commander of the Norrland Artillery Regiment (A 4) in 1942 and the Bergslagen Artillery Regiment (A 9) in 1943.

Årmann was military commander of the III Military District in 1950 (acting in 1946) and was promoted to major general in 1950. He was then the Chief of the Military Office of the Ministry of Defence from 1951 to 1960 when he retired from active service and was promoted to lieutenant general in the reserve. Årmann then served as War Materials Inspector and head of the National Swedish War Materials Inspectorate at the Ministry of Trade from 1960 to 1964.

Other work
Årmann became chairman of the Skövde Flying Club in 1946 and of the Skövde department of the Society for the Promotion of Ski Sport and Open Air Life (Skid- och friluftsfrämjandet) in 1946. He was a member of the Enrollment Council (Inskrivningsrådet) in 1955.

Personal life
In 1926 he married Brita Flach (born 1902), the daughter of estate owner Erik Flach and Tyra (née Schubert). Årmann was the father of Jan (born 1928) and Christina (born 1931).

Dates of rank
1915 – Second lieutenant
1917 – Underlöjtnant
1918 – Lieutenant
1926 – Captain
1936 – Major
1939 – Lieutenant colonel
1941 – Colonel
1950 – Major general
1960 – Lieutenant general

Awards and decorations

Swedish
   Commander Grand Cross of the Order of the Sword (11 November 1957)
   Commander 1st Class of the Order of the Sword (15 November 1947)
   Commander of the Order of the Sword (15 November 1945)
   Knight 1st Class of the Order of the Sword (1936)
   Knight 1st Class of the order of the Order of Vasa (1941)
   Home Guard Medal of Merit
  Equestrian Olympic Medal (Ryttarolympisk förtjänstmedalj)

Foreign
   Commander 1st Class of the Order of the Dannebrog
   Commander 1st Class of the Order of the White Rose of Finland
   Commander with Star of the Order of St. Olav (1 July 1954)
   3rd Class of the Order of the Cross of Liberty with swords
   Commander of the Legion of Honour

Honours
Member of the Royal Swedish Academy of War Sciences (1944)

References

External links
 

1894 births
1988 deaths
Swedish Army lieutenant generals
People from Örebro Municipality
Swedish male modern pentathletes
Olympic modern pentathletes of Sweden
Modern pentathletes at the 1924 Summer Olympics
Members of the Royal Swedish Academy of War Sciences
Commanders Grand Cross of the Order of the Sword
Knights First Class of the Order of Vasa
Sportspeople from Örebro County